Clallam Bay is an unincorporated community and census-designated place (CDP) in Clallam County, Washington, United States, at the mouth of the Clallam River into Clallam Bay. Known for its natural environment and hunting, Clallam Bay is partially reliant on tourism. Clallam Bay is considered the twin city of nearby Sekiu. As of the 2010 census, the population of Clallam Bay was 363.

History
Clallam Bay was founded in the 1880s as a steamboat stop. It became a mill town in 1890. Two years later, the mill burned, and making barrels for West Clallam Bay's tanning extract became its main industry. In 1905, the lighthouse at Slip Point was lighted on April Fool's Day.

Sekiu Point (pronounced "See'-kew"), the western cape of Clallam Bay, was first charted by Captain Henry "OG"  Kellett in 1847. The town of Sekiu was founded as "West Clallam" in 1870, by A.J. Martin who built a salmon cannery to be nearer the fishing grounds. The area boomed before the turn of the century when a leather tanning extract was produced here by the Pacific Tanning Extract Company established in 1887. Sekiu crashed in 1893 when the demand for the extract ceased, and hundreds of men were left unemployed. People turned to fishing, and later logging. From 1902 to 1907, D.A. Robinson logged here, building a railroad with what was then the longest railroad bridge in the world.

Geography and climate
The community of Clallam Bay is located in northwestern Clallam County, where the Clallam River enters the southeastern side of Clallam Bay, a small indentation in the Strait of Juan de Fuca. Washington State Route 112 passes through the community, leading south  to Sappho on US 101.

References

Census-designated places in Washington (state)
Census-designated places in Clallam County, Washington
Populated coastal places in Washington (state)